Mathias Bourgue was the defending champion, but lost in the first round to Scott Griekspoor.

Carlos Berlocq won the title after defeating Steve Darcis 6–2, 6–0 in the final.

Seeds

Draw

Finals

Top half

Bottom half

References
 Main Draw
 Qualifying Draw

Internationaux de Tennis de Blois - Singles
2016 Singles